Ron Hibbert (24 March 1924 – 8 December 1996) was an Australian rules footballer who played with Collingwood in the Victorian Football League (VFL).

Notes

External links 	
	
		
Profile on Collingwood Forever

		
1924 births		
1996 deaths		
		
Australian rules footballers from Victoria (Australia)		
Collingwood Football Club players